Monochroa fervidella is a moth of the family Gelechiidae. It was described by Josef Johann Mann in 1864. It is found in Asia Minor.

The forewings are shining gold brown, shading to coppery red at the fold. There are three paler spots at the margin. Adults have been recorded on wing in June.

References

Moths described in 1864
Monochroa